The 1986–87 Yugoslav Cup was the 39th season of the top football knockout competition in SFR Yugoslavia, the Yugoslav Cup, also known as the "Marshal Tito Cup" (Kup Maršala Tita), since its establishment in 1946. Hajduk Split beat Rijeka in the final.

First round
In the following tables winning teams are marked in bold; teams from outside top level are marked in italic script.

Second round

Quarter-finals

Semi-finals

Final

External links
1986–87 cup season details at Rec.Sport.Soccer Statistics Foundation
1987 cup final details at Rec.Sport.Soccer Statistics Foundation

See also
1986–87 Yugoslav First League
1986–87 Yugoslav Second League

Yugoslav Cup seasons
Cup
Yugo